Jack Riley (c. 1874 – 19 June 1924) was an English professional rugby league footballer who played in the 1900s. He played at representative level for England, and at club level for Halifax, as a forward (prior to the specialist positions of), during the era of contested scrums, and represented England in the first ever international rugby league game in 1904.

Playing career
Riley started his rugby career with his local team in the village of Luddenden Foot, aged 17. In October 1893, he was signed by Halifax.

International honours
Jack Riley won a cap playing as a forward, i.e. number 10 (in an experimental 12-a-side team), for England in the 3-9 defeat by Other Nationalities at Central Park, Wigan on Tuesday 5 April 1904, in the first ever international rugby league match.

Challenge Cup Final appearances
Jack Riley played as a forward, i.e. number 8, in Halifax's 7-0 victory over Salford in the 1902–03 Challenge Cup Final during the 1902–03 season at Headingley Rugby Stadium, Leeds on Saturday 25 April 1903, in front of a crowd of 32,507, and played as a forward, i.e. number 12, in the 8-3 victory over Warrington in the 1903–04 Challenge Cup Final during the 1903–04 season at The Willows, Salford on Saturday 30 April 1904, in front of a crowd of 17,041.

Personal life
After retiring from rugby, Riley became a pub licensee. On 19 June 1924, Riley died at the Old King Cross Inn in Halifax, aged 50. He was buried in Stoney Royd Cemetery.

References

External links

1870s births
1924 deaths
England national rugby league team players
English rugby league players
English rugby union players
Halifax R.L.F.C. players
Publicans
Rugby league forwards
Rugby league players from Halifax, West Yorkshire
Rugby union players from Halifax, West Yorkshire
Rugby union forwards